'Mamoroallo Tjoka (born 25 October 1984 in Ha Seqhoe, Malehloana, Lesotho) is a Basotho long-distance runner who competed in the marathon event at the 2008 and 2012 Summer Olympics. She was the flag bearer of Lesotho during the 2012 Summer Olympics opening ceremony.

References 

1984 births
Living people
Athletes (track and field) at the 2008 Summer Olympics
Athletes (track and field) at the 2012 Summer Olympics
Lesotho female long-distance runners
Lesotho female marathon runners
Olympic athletes of Lesotho
People from Thaba-Tseka District